Artemovo is a rural locality (a village) in Rostilovskoye Rural Settlement, Gryazovetsky District, Vologda Oblast, Russia. The population was 15 as of 2002.

Geography 
Artemovo is located 35 km south of Gryazovets (the district's administrative centre) by road. Yelnik is the nearest rural locality.

References 

Rural localities in Gryazovetsky District